Flip That House is an American television series created by the Discovery Home Channel and also broadcast on TLC. Each episode showed a different individual (or group of people) flipping a house. The show was produced by R. J. Cutler, who was inspired to make it after buying a new house.

Content
The show is about people who buy neglected houses to refurbish and then resell for a profit, an act known as flipping. Many of the first episodes of the show focused on houses in the area of Los Angeles, California.

Airdates

Locations
During the first season, most episodes took place in the Southern California (Los Angeles) area. Subsequent seasons presented flips that occurred in other areas including:
 San Diego, California
 Phoenix, Arizona
 Las Vegas, Nevada
 Austin, Texas
 Houston, Texas
 Columbia, South Carolina
 Atlanta, Georgia
 New Orleans, Louisiana – These episodes focused on houses being repaired after Hurricane Katrina.
 Boston, Massachusetts

References

External links
 

2005 American television series debuts
2008 American television series endings
2000s American reality television series
Discovery Home (American network) original programming
English-language television shows
Home renovation television series
TLC (TV network) original programming
Television shows set in the United States